John Gombojab Hangin (1921–October 9, 1989) was a scholar of Mongolian studies. He authored several Mongolian dictionaries and textbooks and is credited by The New York Times with helping to establish recognition for the Mongolian People's Republic from the United Nations and the United States.

In Japan
Hangin was born in Taibus Banner, Chahar, Inner Mongolia to a prominent family who had long been active in the Qing Dynasty court. He was sent to Hokkaido Imperial University in Japan to study during World War II, afterward taking a position as a secretary in the Mengjiang government of Prince Demchugdongrub. He was elected to the National Assembly of the Republic of China in 1947; however, after the Chinese Civil War ended with a communist victory, he emigrated to the United States in 1949.

In the United States
In the US, under the guidance of Owen Lattimore, Hangin studied at Johns Hopkins University, the University of California, Berkeley, Columbia University, and Indiana University (where he received his Ph.D.). After graduation, he served on the faculties of several universities, including Columbia University, Georgetown University and UC Berkeley, before settling at Indiana University.

Hangin acted as a conduit between Americans and Mongolians. The New York Times, in its 1989 obituary, indicated that "[h]is efforts helped to lay the groundwork for recognition of the Mongolian People's Republic by the United Nations in 1961 and American recognition in 1987." In addition to publishing several textbooks and dictionaries on the Mongolian language, Hangin also founded the Mongolia Society at Indiana University and established the Mongol-American Cultural Association (MACA).

Death and legacy
Hangin died of heart disease while doing research in Ulan Bator, Mongolia. He is buried in the Altan-Ölgii National Cemetery.

The Mongolia Society offers a scholarship in his name to Mongolian students who wish to study in the United States.

Notes

External links
MACA homepage

1921 births
1989 deaths
Mongolists
Linguists from the United States
Hokkaido University alumni
Indiana University alumni
Republic of China politicians from Inner Mongolia
Political office-holders in the Republic of China
People from Xilingol League
20th-century linguists
Chinese expatriates in Japan
Chinese emigrants to the United States
University of California, Berkeley alumni
Johns Hopkins University alumni
Columbia University alumni
Georgetown University faculty